The common scoter (Melanitta nigra) is a large sea duck,  in length, which breeds over the far north of Europe and the Palearctic east to the Olenyok River. The genus name is derived from Ancient Greek melas, "black", and netta, "duck". The species name is from Latin niger "shining black". The black scoter (M. americana) of North America and eastern Siberia is sometimes considered a subspecies of M. nigra.

Description
It is characterised by its bulky shape and large bill. The male is all black with a bulbous bill which shows some yellow coloration around the nostrils. The female is a brown bird with pale cheeks, very similar to female black scoter.

This species can be distinguished from other scoters, apart from black scoter, by the lack of white anywhere on the drake and the more extensive pale areas on the female.

Vocalisations
Black scoter and common scoter have diagnosably distinct vocalisations.

Ecology
It winters farther south in temperate zones, on the coasts of Europe as far south as Morocco. It forms large flocks on suitable coastal waters. These are tightly packed, and the birds tend to take off and dive together.

The lined nest is built on the ground close to the sea, lakes or rivers, in woodland or tundra. 6-8 eggs are laid.

This species dives for crustaceans and molluscs; it also eats aquatic insects and small fish when on fresh water.

The common scoter is one of the species to which the Agreement on the Conservation of African-Eurasian Migratory Waterbirds (AEWA) applies.

UK population and current issues
In 1977, Campbell estimated the wintering population in north-western Europe to be about 130,000, mostly in the Baltic area, and the UK population at about 20,000. There is a marked passage in spring through the Straits of Dover.

In 2003, a previously unknown wintering population of 50,000+ was found on Shell Flat in the north west of England by Cirrus Energy whilst surveying the area for a new wind farm. Due to this development and an oil spill off the coast of Wales in 1996, questions about the common scoter population have been asked in the UK Parliament.

Although the common scoter is a winter visitor to the UK, there are some breeding pairs in the north of Scotland. The species has been placed on the RSPB conservation Red List because of a greater than 50% decline in the UK breeding population. In 1998, the UK Government agreed to a biodiversity action plan (BAP) for the common scoter to increase the breeding population to 100 pairs by 2008. The Northern Irish population, which had reached a peak of 150–200 pairs in the 1970s, crashed disastrously in the 1990s and by 2010 there were no confirmed reports of breeding. However, 100 pairs were recorded in the south of Ireland in a 1995 survey.  UK breeding pairs have declined to 35 as of 2015 and attempts are being made to research why.

At the third steering group meeting of the UK Common Scoter Biodiversity Action Plan (BAP), the population in the Shell Flat area was put at 16,500 wintering scoter and 5,000 moulting birds, of which 4,000 used the footprint area of the proposed wind farm.

Scoters and Meatless Fridays in France
In parts of France, in the nineteenth century and earlier, the common scoter was accepted by the Roman Catholic Church as a substitute for fish during the Friday Fast.

References

External links

 Common scoter Photos, text and map at Oiseaux.net
 
 
 
 

Melanitta
Birds of Europe
Birds of the Middle East
Birds described in 1758
Taxa named by Carl Linnaeus